"Up All Night" is the debut solo single by English musician Matt Willis. It was released as a single on 22 May 2006 and appears on his debut album, Don't Let It Go to Waste. The song is about how Willis keeps thinking of a girl, and as a result cannot sleep at night. It debuted at number 52 on the UK Singles Chart on download sales alone. The following week, it peaked at number seven after the physical release. It stayed in the UK chart for a total of four weeks.

The video for "Up All Night" features Willis in a house late at night and flashes back and forth between scenes of Willis having difficulty sleeping and Willis in the midst of a party. Willis's first televised performance of "Up All Night" took place on 7 May 2006 on Top of the Pops. He then performed the song again on the same show on 28 May 2006, three weeks since his TV debut.

Track listings
 CD2 contains a free beer mat, with images of a dragon on the front and Willis on the rear.

Charts

Weekly charts

Year-end charts

References

External links
 Matt Willis's official site

2006 songs
2006 debut singles
Matt Willis songs
Mercury Records singles
Songs written by Jason Perry (singer)
Songs written by Julian Emery
Songs written by Matt Willis